Yuriy Pantya (born 5 April 1990) is a Ukrainian professional footballer who plays for Neman Grodno.

References

External links 
 
 
 

1990 births
Living people
Sportspeople from Chernivtsi
Ukrainian footballers
Association football midfielders
Ukrainian expatriate footballers
Expatriate footballers in Moldova
Expatriate footballers in Belarus
FC Nistru Otaci players
FC Bukovyna Chernivtsi players
FC Bakhchisaray players
FC Krymteplytsia Molodizhne players
FC Slavia Mozyr players
FC Gomel players
FC Neman Grodno players
Ukrainian expatriate sportspeople in Moldova
Ukrainian expatriate sportspeople in Belarus